These are the results of the men's singles competition, one of two events for male competitors in table tennis at the 1992 Summer Olympics in Barcelona.

Group stage

Group A

Group B

Group C

Group D

Group E

Group F

Group G

Group H

Group I

Group J

Group K

Group L

Group M

Group N

Group O

Group P

Knockout stage

References

External links
 Official Report of the Games of the XXV Olympiad, Barcelona 1992, v. 5. Digitally published by the LA84 Foundation.
 1992 Summer Olympics / Table Tennis / Singles, Men. Olympedia.

Table tennis at the 1992 Summer Olympics
Men's events at the 1992 Summer Olympics